The 2015–16 Liga Panameña de Fútbol season (also known as the Liga Cable Onda) was the 26th season of top-flight football in Panama. The season began on 2015 and ended in May 2016. Ten teams competed throughout the entire season.

Teams
Independiente F.C. finished in 10th place in the overall table last season and were relegated to the Liga Nacional de Ascenso. Taking their place for this season are the overall champions of last season's Liga Nacional de Ascenso Atlético Nacional.

2015 Apertura

Personnel and sponsoring (2015 Apertura)

Managerial changes

Beginning of the season

During the season

Standings

Results

Second stage

Semifinals
First legs

Second legs

Arabe Unido won 3–2 on aggregate.

Chorrillio drew 2-2 on aggregate, they won in pen 4-3.

Finals 
Grand Final

List of foreign players in the league
This is a list of foreign players in Apertura 2015. The following players:
have played at least one apertura game for the respective club.
have not been capped for the Panama national football team on any level, independently from the birthplace

Alianza 
  Facundo Kroeck
  Robyn Pertuz
  Gerardo Negrete
  Mauricio Castaño

Arabe Unido
  Miguel Lloyd

Chepo
  Miguel Duque

Chorillo
  Caio Milan
  Fabio da Silva
  Jorge Henriquez

Plaza Amador
  Ismael Remacha
  Ezequiel Palomeque
  Ariel Bonilla
  Julio César Castillo

 (player released mid season)

Atlético Chiriquí 
  Erick Araya Godines
  Pablo César Murillo 
  Ánderson Diaz

Atletico Nacional
  Manuel Murillo 
  Andrés Santamaría

San Francisco FC
 None

Sporting San Miguelito
  None

Tauro FC
  Varcan Sterling
  Carlos Sierra 
  Richard Ibargüen
  Carlos Mosquera

2016 Clausura

Personnel and sponsoring (2016 Clausura)

Standings

Results

Second stage

Semifinals
First legs

Second legs

Plaza Amador won 3–2 on aggregate.

Chorrillio won 3-0 on aggregate.

Finals 
Grand Final

List of foreign players in the league
This is a list of foreign players in Clausura 2016. The following players:
have played at least one apertura game for the respective club.
have not been capped for the Panama national football team on any level, independently from the birthplace

Alianza 
  Facundo Kroeck
  Robyn Pertuz
  Gerardo Negrete
  Mauricio Castaño

Arabe Unido
  Miguel Lloyd

Chepo
  Miguel Duque

Chorillo
  Caio Milan
  Fabio da Silva
  Jorge Henriquez
  Yustin Arboleda

Plaza Amador
  Ismael Remacha
  Ezequiel Palomeque
  Ariel Bonilla
  Julio César Castillo

 (player released mid season)

Atlético Chiriquí 
  Erick Araya Godines
  Pablo César Murillo 
  Ánderson Diaz

Atletico Nacional
  Manuel Murillo 
  Andrés Santamaría

San Francisco FC
  Wanegre Delgado de Armas

Sporting San Miguelito
  None

Tauro FC
  Varcan Sterling
  Carlos Sierra 
  Richard Ibargüen
  Carlos Mosquera
  Ariel Bonilla

External links
 https://web.archive.org/web/20181006121704/http://panamafutbol.com/?cat=3&paged=3
 http://lpf.com.pa/w/category/noticas/
 https://int.soccerway.com/national/panama/lpf/20152016/apertura/r31790/
 http://www.rpctv.com/deportes/futbolnacional/

Liga Panameña de Fútbol seasons
1
Pan